Peter Baykov (born 21 March 1998) is a Bulgarian-born film and theater actor, known for dubbing movies, series and commercials in Bulgarian, English, French and Russian. He is able to recreate live over 40 different male and female voices, as seen on the Got Talent Show in Bulgaria.

Early life and education 
Baykov was born in Sofia, Bulgaria. From a young age he is fluent in English and Bulgarian, being born in a multi-lingual family.

He studied bachelor of Film and TV Production in London, United Kingdom after graduating from the National Trade and Banking High School in Sofia.

In 2017 he attended the New Bulgarian University to finish his studies and graduate with a bachelor's degree in Acting for Film and Theatre.

During his studies in 2018, he does the dubbing for every character in Beauty and the Beast and Maleficent by changing his voice from male to female live in special screenings held at New Bulgarian University.

On June 17th, 2021, Peter Baykov does the dubbing for all the 45 roles in the Disney musical Mary Poppins Returns. He also performs all the songs from the movie in Bulgarian by naturally changing his voice as part of his Acting BA diploma work at New Bulgarian University.

Acting career 
Baykov began his acting career at an early age with the dubbing of movies and television series. In 2019 he made his television debut in the Got Talent Show in Bulgaria where he reached the finals. The same year, he got cast in several main roles in movies for Walt Disney Studios for their international release, one of which was Prince Philip in Maleficent: Mistress of Evil at Shepperton Studios.

Music career 
In 2020 he made his musical singing debut in the album "Veliko 2020" by Elitsa Todorova with their duet song - "Rosinka".

Filmography

Film

Television

References

External links 
 

Living people
1998 births
21st-century Bulgarian male actors
Bulgarian male film actors
Bulgarian male television actors
Bulgarian male voice actors
Male actors from Sofia
21st-century Bulgarian male singers